All Falling Down is a 1951 picture book written by Gene Zion and illustrated by Margaret Bloy Graham. The book depicts objects falling down. The book was a recipient of a 1952 Caldecott Honor for its illustrations.

References

1951 children's books
American picture books
Caldecott Honor-winning works